Leroy "Red" Bass (May 5, 1918 – May 7, 2003) was an American baseball catcher in the Negro leagues. He played with the Homestead Grays and the Birmingham Black Barons in 1940.

References

External links
 and Seamheads

Homestead Grays players
Birmingham Black Barons players
1918 births
2003 deaths
Baseball players from Mississippi
Baseball catchers
20th-century African-American sportspeople
21st-century African-American people